Reach Beyond the Sun is the fourth studio album by hardcore punk band Shai Hulud, released on February 15, 2013 in Europe and on February 19 in the U.S. through Metal Blade Records. It has been met with positive reviews.

Track list

Credits

Chad Gilbert – vocals, producer
Matt Fox – guitar
Matthew Fletcher – bass guitar
Matt Covey – drums
Justin Kraus (With Life in Mind) – backup vocals
Damien Moyal – guest vocals on "Medicine to the Dead"
Matt Mazzali – guest vocals on "Medicine to the Dead"
Geert van der Velde – guest vocals on "Medicine to the Dead"
Louis Hernandez (Alpha & Omega) – guest vocals on "Man Into Demon: and Their Faces are Twisted With the Pain of Living"
Jonathan Vigil (The Ghost Inside) – guest vocals on "If A Mountain be My Obstacle"
Jay Pepito (Reign Supreme) – guest vocals on "A Human Failing"
Stephen Looker – backing vocals
Dave Quiggle – artwork

Release history

References

2013 albums
Shai Hulud albums
Metal Blade Records albums
Albums produced by Chad Gilbert